The Brussels International Exposition of 1935 was a world's fair held between 27 April and 6 November 1935 on the Heysel/Heizel Plateau in Brussels, Belgium.

History
The 1935 World's Fair was the tenth world's fair hosted by Belgium, and the fourth in Brussels, following the fairs in 1888, 1897 and 1910. Officially sanctioned by the Bureau International des Expositions (BIE), twenty-five countries officially participated and a further five were unofficially represented. The theme was colonisation, on the 50th anniversary of the establishment of the Congo Free State.

The exhibition attracted some twenty million visitors. The Belgian architect Joseph van Neck was the principal architect of the fair and of the Art Deco Palais des Expositions (also known as the Grand Palais), with its interior concrete parabolic arches, and four heroic bronze statues on piers.

Among many other contributors, Le Corbusier designed part of the French exhibit; the Belgian modernist architect Victor Bourgeois designed the Palais des Expositions (or Grand Palais), the Leopold II restaurant and the Soprocol pavilion. The Belgian art exposition prominently displayed the work of contemporary Belgian artists, including Paul Delvaux, René Magritte and Louis Van Lint, boosting their careers.  

The Palais des Expositions, and at least three other of the 1935 structures, were re-used for the 1958 Brussels World's Fair (Expo '58), which was held on the same site in 1958.

Gallery

See also
 The poster for the exhibition was designed by Leo Marfurt
 Brussels Expo

References

Notes

Bibliography

External links

  of the BIE
 BIE description (PDF) 

World's fairs in Brussels
1935 in Belgium
1930s in Brussels
Events in Brussels